The 1899 Pittsburgh College football team was an American football team that represented Pittsburgh Catholic College of the Holy Ghost—now known as Duquesne University—during the 1897 college football season.

Schedule

References

Pittsburgh College
Duquesne Dukes football seasons
Pittsburgh College football